In 1480 the small Knights Hospitaller garrison of Rhodes withstood an attack of the Ottoman Empire.

Attack
On 23 May 1480 an Ottoman fleet of 160 ships appeared before Rhodes, at the gulf of Trianda, along with an army of 70,000 men under the command of Mesih Pasha. The Knights Hospitaller garrison was led by Grand Master Pierre d'Aubusson.

The Ottomans' first goal was to capture the Tower of St Nicholas, a strategic point for the knights' defence of the two harbours: Mandraki, and the one to the east bay of Akandia. The Turkish artillery kept up an unbroken bombardment and, from 9 June on, the infantry made a series of attacks. Grand Master d'Aubusson himself sped to the aid of the garrison and the enemy was repelled after a fierce struggle.

A second attack on the town occurred on the eastern sector of the wall near the Jewish quarter, towards the bay of Akandia, which was the battle station of the "tongue" of Italy and was quite weak. The Knights and townspeople dug a new moat on the inside of the wall at this point and constructed a new internal fortification, while bombardment from the Turkish artillery was ongoing. Once again the Knights defended the town, and after a bitter battle with many casualties on both sides, the danger was once more averted.

At dawn on 27 July, the Turks launched a vigorous offensive and their vanguard of around 2,500 Janissaries managed to take the tower of Italy and enter the city. A frenzied struggle ensued. The grand master, wounded in five places, directed the battle and fought with lance in hand. After three hours of fighting the enemy were decimated and the exhausted survivors began to withdraw. The Knights´ counter-attack caused the Turks to beat a disorderly retreat, dragging along with them the Vizier and commander-in-chief. The Hospitallers reached as far as his tent and took, along with other booty, the holy standard of Islam. On that day, between three and four thousand Turks were slain.

On August 17, 1480, the Ottoman fleet gave up their attempt to capture Rhodes. Sultan Mehmed II was furious and would have attacked the island again, but his death in 1481 put a stop to the attempt. In 1521-22 the Ottomans besieged Rhodes once again and captured the city and island.

Historiography

Gulielmus Caoursin, vice-chancellor of the Knights Hospitaller, was an eye-witness of the siege and wrote its description in his Obsidionis Rhodiae Urbis Descriptio (an English translation exists as a part of Edward Gibbon's Crusades). An earlier English translation was the work of John Caius the Elder (printed 1481-84). D'Aubusson's own report on the siege can be found in John Taaffe's history of the Holy, military, sovereign order of st. John of Jerusalem.

Johann Snell printed Obsidionis Rhodiae Urbis Descriptio in Odense, Denmark in 1482, and this printing is regarded as, if not the first, then one of the first two book printings in Denmark.

Gallery

See also
Our Lady of Philermos

References

Bibliography 

 Elias Kollias, The knights of Rhodes - the palace and the city (Athens, 1994)
 Eric Morse, Crusader knights, Turks and Byzantines (Toronto, 2003)
 Kenneth M. Setton, The Papacy and the Levant vol.3, 1984
 Erik Svane & Dan Greenberg, Croisade vers la Terre Sainte (Geneva, 2007)
 Smith, Robert Doulgas and DeVries, Kelly (2011), Rhodes Besieged. A new history, Stroud: The History Press, 

1480 in Europe
Rhodes 1480
Rhodes 1480
Rhodes under the Knights Hospitaller
Conflicts in 1480
1480 in the Ottoman Empire
Events in Rhodes
Amphibious operations